Stephen Bentley (born 1954) is an American cartoonist with Creators Syndicate and the creator of Herb and Jamaal.

Originally from Los Angeles, Bentley moved to Pasadena as a teenager and attended John Muir High School, graduating in 1972. After high school he joined the United States Navy where he first began drawing newspaper cartoons. After the navy, Bentley attended Pasadena City College and Rio Hondo College majoring in art, English, and fire sciences, before beginning work in advertising.

Bentley is a deacon in the Episcopal Church.

References

External links 

 Billy Ireland Cartoon Library & Museum Art Database

1954 births
Living people
African-American comics creators
American comics creators
American comic strip cartoonists
Artists from Pasadena, California
African-American Episcopalians
African-American Christian clergy
21st-century African-American people
20th-century African-American people
Pasadena City College alumni
John Muir High School alumni